Erik Clausen (born 7 March 1942) is a Danish actor, film director and screenwriter. He has directed fourteen films since 1981. His 2007 film Temporary Release was entered into the 29th Moscow International Film Festival.

Filmography

References

External links

Clausen Film (His filmcompany)
ErikClausen.dk (His personal website)

1942 births
Living people
Danish male film actors
Danish male screenwriters
People from Copenhagen
Male actors from Copenhagen
Film directors from Copenhagen